Pirin is a mountain range in Bulgaria.

Pirin may also refer to:

Places 
 Pirin National Park, a protected area in Bulgaria
 Pirin (Bulgarian village), a village in southwestern Bulgaria
 Pirin, Kreševo, a village in Bosnia and Herzegovina
 Pirin, Iran, a village in Iran
 Pirin Glacier, in Antarctica

Football clubs 
 OFC Pirin Blagoevgrad
 PFC Pirin Blagoevgrad
 FC Pirin Gotse Delchev
 FC Pirin Razlog

Other uses 
 Pirin Folk Ensemble, a Bulgarian music and dance group
 SS Pirin, a Bulgarian steamship in service 1961–65

See also 
 Pirin Macedonia, a historic region
 Pirin-Fiat, a brand of cars
 Pyrin
 Perin (disambiguation)